The Top 500 Enterprises of China is a ranking of the top enterprises in the People's Republic of China created by the Chinese Federation of Enterprises (CFE). The top-ranking company in 2005 was China Petrochemical Corporation, also known as Sinopec.

In 2006 the top 500 enterprises accounted for 78% of China's GDP. The top five were:
Sinopec
State Grid Corporation of China
China National Petroleum Corporation
Industrial and Commercial Bank of China
China Mobile

The top five in 2007 were:
Sinopec
China National Petroleum Corporation
State Grid Corporation of China
Industrial and Commercial Bank of China
China Mobile

References 

Lists of companies by revenue
Lists of companies of China